Hastings Community Elementary is a public elementary school in Vancouver, British Columbia at Penticton and Franklin Street and part of School District 39 Vancouver. It is named after Rear-Admiral George Fowler Hastings (1814–1876), British Commander of the Pacific Squadron.

History  
Hastings School was built on its present site in 1908. The original wooden building was replaced with the present masonry structure and several additions have been added since that time.  The present school building underwent a total renovation that was completed in 1997.  An addition of six classrooms on the north side of the school was added September, 2003. A new playground for the intermediates at the school, part of the 100 year anniversary, was made in the summer of 2009. Another new playground for the primary students was completed in 2013. Hastings is a large, complex, inner city project school with strong parent support and involvement.  Apart from having both English and French Immersion programs, Hastings is also a community school with a diverse population of ESL learners, and partnerships with many other community agencies.  Hastings has 670 students in Kindergarten to Grade Seven - 230 in French Immersion and 440 in English.  Its annex, Tillicum Elementary Community School, is five blocks away and has 195 students in Kindergarten to Grade Four.  The major ethnic groups in the school are of Chinese, Vietnamese, Central American Spanish, European and First Nations descent.

Teams 
Hastings Elementary School has a diverse number of sports teams within its school community to promote fitness and health, while enjoying it and making new friends along the way and gaining new skills.

 Volleyball
 Basketball
 Soccer
 Handball 
 Badminton
 Track and Field
 Long Jump

Clubs 
Hastings Elementary School has a very charismatic student community. Students may choose to contribute towards the school community by joining these clubs.

 Leadership Club - The group that assists the Parent Advisory Council in organizing events.
 SOGI Club - A save haven for those who are LGBTQ+.
 Parent Advisory Council - A group of parents who supports and organizes many school events that bring the school community closer with each other.

Classes 
Mathematics, Science, Social Studies, health and career, Music, Art, and more.

Notable alumni 
Al Hendrix, father of the musician Jimi Hendrix

References

External links

 Class Size
 Satisfaction Survey
 School Performance
 Skills Assessment

Elementary schools in Vancouver